Novopsocus stenopterus is a Psocoptera species found in New Guinea. It is the type species of its genus, characterised by similar sexes, the males having antennae similar to those of females. There are two other species of Novopsocus.

References 

Pseudocaeciliidae
Insects of New Guinea
Insects described in 1977